Asiago Hockey 1935 is an Italian ice hockey team from Asiago which plays in the ICE Hockey League. Until 2021–22, Asiago played in the Italian Hockey League - Serie A, winning the championship eight times.

Honours
Domestic
Italian Hockey League - Serie A
Winners (8): 2000–01, 2009–10, 2010–11, 2012–13, 2014–15, 2019–20, 2020–21, 2021–22

Coppa Italia
Winners (3): 1991, 2000–01, 2001–02

Supercoppa Italiana
Winners (6): 2003, 2013, 2015, 2020, 2021, 2022

International
Alps Hockey League
Winners (2): 2017–18, 2021–22

External links 
 Official website

Alpenliga teams
Austrian Hockey League teams
Ice hockey clubs established in 1935
1935 establishments in Italy
Ice hockey teams in Italy
Sport in Veneto
Province of Vicenza